Galaxy Airlines was a US airline based in Fort Lauderdale, Florida.
At least 30 employees worked for Galaxy Airlines. The airline stayed in service from 1978 to 1987.

Fleet
Convair 990
Lockheed L-188 Electra

Accidents and incidents
In January 1985, Galaxy Airlines Flight 203, a Lockheed L-188 Electra, crashed shortly after takeoff in Reno, Nevada, killing 70 people and leaving one survivor. The airline was temporarily shut down and its aircraft were inspected, yet eight days later another Galaxy Airlines Electra, which had been inspected by the FAA, crash landed on a cargo flight with no casualties due to a landing gear failure.

See also
 List of defunct airlines of the United States

References

External links
NTSB summary of fatal incidents
NTSB safety recommendation resulting from the incident

 
Defunct airlines of the United States
Airlines disestablished in 1986
Companies based in Fort Lauderdale, Florida
Defunct companies based in Florida